Reyn Spooner is an American fashion design company founded in 1956 by Reyn McCullough and Ruth Spooner. The company was originally named Reyns Men's wear, on the island of Catalina founded by Reyn McCullough, who sought to replace the kitschy and poorly-fitting Hawaiian shirts with a more stylish alternative for professional and casual wear.

History 
Founder Reynolds McCullough was raised in the 1930s on Catalina Island, California. In the 1940s, after World War II, McCullough returned from Army paratrooper service and took a job with a chain of southern California men's stores. He then bought his employer's shop in Avalon. He started developing as many as six stores on Catalina, among them Reyn's Men's Wear and the Catalina Department store selling designer men's sportswear and Hawaiian printed shirts McCullough created.

McCullough and his wife Deanne visited Honolulu for two weeks in 1957. While in Hawaii, McCullough met Don Graham of the Dillingham Corporation, the developers of the soon-to-be Ala Moana Shopping Center. After returning to Catalina, a space in the new shopping center became available and was offered to him. In November 1959, McCullough left behind his men's wear shop "Reyn's", and headed to Honolulu, where he opened his first Hawaii retail store within the Ala Moana Shopping Center.

Meanwhile, in 1956, Ruth Spooner had opened Spooner's of Waikiki and quickly built a reputation in Hawaii for manufacturing quality surf trunks. Working with just one sewing machine, his custom swimwear became known for their unique construction.

In 1962, McCullough teamed up with Ruth Spooner to ensure consistent quality and decided to merge the two company names to create Reyn Spooner in Honolulu. He then set up four sewing machines in the basement of his Ala Moana store to create Aloha apparel. McCullough began to work on something that reflected the island heritage through stylish prints, but also benefited the young professionals who worked in the islands and shopped at his store.

Spooner Kloth was created in 1964, when Tom Anderson, Reyn's Ala Moana store Assistant Manager, brought McCullough one of Pat Dorian's original "reverse" print shirts. Dorian was a charismatic bartender who would wear his signature line of "aloha wear" while serving drinks. Initially, Anderson wasn't keen on Dorian's bright patterns and the two discussed muting the print by turning it inside out.

Reyn Spooner started selling clothing internationally in 1974, when the company started shipping Aloha apparel to Japan, Australia, and Canada.

In 1984, Reyn Spooner collaborated with Vans, in which original Reyn Spooner prints were used for Vans footwear. In 1996, Reyn Spooner teamed up with "lifestyle-artist" Eddy Y. to create shirts featuring original Eddy Y. artwork. In 2009, Reyn Spooner collaborated with Urban Outfitters to create a collection of slim-fit shirts. Shortly after, Reyn teamed up with Stussy to develop an exclusive print for the clothing brand. Shortly after in 2010, Reyn Spooner debuted its Modern Collection. In 2011, Reyn Spooner collaborated with Opening Ceremony.

Reyn Spooner is now owned by Aloha Brands, representing a group of investors, led by Charlie Baxter and Dave Abrams.

Product lines
 
The Classic collection uses Reyn Spooner's traditional Spooner Kloth, which was first introduced in 1964 and became known as the oxford cloth of the islands. This cloth combines combed cotton with properties of spun polyester, which guarantees years of wash-n-wear durability. The Classic Collection offers prints from Dietrich Varez, Eddy Y, and Naoki.

Reyn Spooner has continued innovating their fabrications and designs, with the most recent addition being the Modern Collection. This collection was created to appeal to a younger audience and broaden their customer base. 

In recent years, Reyn Spooner has also collaborated with fashion brands such as Urban Outfitters, Stussy, Transpac and Opening Ceremony to create exclusive apparel. Currently, Reyn Spooner operates seven retail stores in Hawaii and sells apparel in specialty and department stores throughout the United States, abroad, and online. Reyn Spooner has been worn by celebrities like George Clooney in the movie The Descendants and Chi McBride in Hawaii Five-0.

References

Companies based in Honolulu
American fashion designers
Menswear designers